Balázs Taróczy was the defending champion, but chose to compete at Hilversum in the same week.

Thierry Tulasne won the title by defeating Anders Järryd 6–2, 6–3 in the final.

Seeds

Draw

Finals

Top half

Bottom half

References

External links
 Official results archive (ATP)
 Official results archive (ITF)

Men's Singles
Singles